The Honghe tram (Chinese: 红河有轨电车) is a tram operating in Mengzi City, Honghe Prefecture, Yunnan Province, China. The rolling stock was provided by CRRC Nanjing Puzhen.

History
Construction began on 6 August 2015.

The project was delayed. Testing began on 21 September 2020. The first line officially opened to the public on 1 October.

Route
The line runs south from Mengzi North railway station.

References

Tram transport in China
Honghe Hani and Yi Autonomous Prefecture